The Balkan League was a multi-nation ice hockey league contested from 1994–1997 by three countries from the Balkan region of Europe, Serbia and Montenegro, Romania, and Bulgaria.

Champions

References

  
Defunct multi-national ice hockey leagues in Europe
Ice hockey leagues in Romania
Ice hockey leagues in Bulgaria
Ice hockey leagues in Serbia
Sports leagues established in 1994
Sport in the Balkans
Sports leagues disestablished in 1997
1994 establishments in Europe
1997 disestablishments in Europe